Triuncidia is a genus of moths of the family Crambidae.

Species
Triuncidia eupalusalis (Walker, 1859)
Triuncidia ossealis (Hampson, 1899)

References

Natural History Museum Lepidoptera genus database

Pyraustinae
Crambidae genera
Taxa named by Eugene G. Munroe